Ondategi is a town located in the province of Álava, in the autonomous community of Basque Country, in the North of Spain.

External links
 ONDATEGI in the Bernardo Estornés Lasa - Auñamendi Encyclopedia (Euskomedia Fundazioa) Information available in Spanish

Populated places in Biscay